Heteromera is a genus of flowering plants in the daisy family described as a genus in 1874.

Heteromera is native to North Africa.

 Species
 Heteromera fuscata (Desf.) Pomel - Algeria, Morocco, Tunisia, Libya
 Heteromera macrocarpa Pomel - Algeria
 Heteromera philaenorum Maire & Weiller - Cyrenaica region of Libya

 homonym genus in Sapotaceae
 Heteromera Montrouz. ex Beauvis syn of Leptostylis
 Heteromera rotundifolium Montrouz. ex Beauvis., syn of Leptostylis micrantha Beauvis.

References

Asteraceae genera
Flora of North Africa
Anthemideae